Arxan (Mongolian for "Hot Springs") is a county-level city in the Hinggan League of northeastern Inner Mongolia in the People's Republic of China.

Geography and climate
It spans part of the southwest of the Greater Khingan Range.

Nearly three-fourths of the annual precipitation occurs from June to September; however, precipitation is frequent year-round, with both frequency and relative humidity peaking in summer and there being a secondary humidity peak during the winter.

Tourism
Arxan National Forest Park is located in Arxan. The park attracts tourists drawn by its landscape of solidified lava formations, crater lakes and dense forests.

Transportation
Arxan is served by the Arxan Yi'ershi Airport.

References

External links

  Official site
  Website of administrative boundaries
  Official site

County-level divisions of Inner Mongolia
Cities in Inner Mongolia